The 2013 UCLA Bruins football team represented the University of California, Los Angeles in the 2013 NCAA Division I FBS football season. The team was coached by second year head coach Jim L. Mora and played its home games at the Rose Bowl in Pasadena, California. They were members of the South Division of the Pac-12 Conference. The Bruins finished the season 10–3, including 6–3 in conference play to finish second in the South Division, and outscored their opponents by a combined total of 480 to 301.

Previous season

Last season, the Bruins won the conference's South Division and played in the Holiday Bowl, where they lost 49–26 to Baylor.

Recruiting
National Signing Day was on February 6, 2013.

*Rivals and ESPN overall ranking do not include Eddie Vanderdoes recruitment.
June 4, 2013 – Highly touted DE Eddie Vanderdoes signed a grant-in-aid with the Bruins, after decommitting from Notre Dame.  Although Vanderdoes was not released from Notre Dame's letter of intent – thus forcing him to sit out the 2013 football season – reports were released that family health issues drove him to decommit and hoped these circumstances will help his appeal to play this season. His appeal to the NCAA National Letter of Intent Appeals Committee was approved on July 30 after his appearance before the committee.

Roster

Key players

Offense
X – Devin Lucien (So.R) or Jordan Payton (So.)
F – Devin Fuller (So.)
LT – Simon Goines (So.)
LG – Xavier Su'a-Filo (Jr.)
C – Jake Brendel (So.R)
RG – Alex Redmond (Fr.)	
RT – Caleb Benenoch (Fr.) 		
Y – Darius Bell (Sr.R)	
BY – Jordan Barrett (Sr.R) 	
QB – Brett Hundley (So.R) 	
FB – Nate Iese (Fr.R) or Phillip Ruhl (Jr.R) 	
TB – Jordon James (Jr.R) 	
Z – Shaquelle Evans (Sr.R)

Defense
LDE – Ellis McCarthy (So.)
NT – Seali'i Epenesa (Sr.)	
RDE – Cassius Marsh (Sr.)	
LOLB – Myles Jack (Fr.) or Aaron Wallace (So.R) 	
ILB – Jordan Zumwalt (Sr.) 	
ILB – Eric Kendricks (Jr.R)
ROLB – Anthony Barr (Sr.)	
LCB – Fabian Moreau (So.)	
S – Anthony Jefferson (Jr.R) 	
S – Randall Goforth (So.)	
RCB – Ishmael Adams (So.)

Specialists
PK – Ka'imi Fairbairn (So.)
KO – Ka'imi Fairbairn (So.) or Sean Covington (Fr.)
P – Sean Covington (Fr.)
LS – Christopher Longo (So.R)
H – Jerry Neuheisel (Fr.R)
Punt return – Shaq Evans (Sr.R)
Kickoff return – Steven Manfro (So.R)

Pre-season
 April 27, 2013 – Spring football was held from April 2 to 27
 July 26, 2013 – 2013 Media Day was held at Sony Pictures Studios, Culver City, California
 August 7, 2013 – Pre-season practices at Cal State San Bernardino began, concluded on August 17.

Schedule

Game summaries

Nevada

Under first year head coach Brian Polian, Nevada played UCLA for the first time. The Wolfpack were highly ranked in the nation last year: scoring (18th), total offense (8th), and rushing (7th).

1st quarter scoring: UCLA – Brett Hundley 37-yard run (Kai'mi Fairbairn kick); NEV – Brent Zuzo 28-yard field goal

2nd quarter scoring: UCLA – Fairbairn 40-yard field goal; NEV – Zuzo 21-yard field goal; UCLA – Shaquell Evans 5-yard pass from Hundley (Fairbairn kick); NEV – Cody Fajardo 1-yard run (Zuzo kick)

3rd quarter scoring: UCLA – Hundley 11-yard run (Fairbairn kick); UCLA – Phillip Ruhl 4-yard blocked punt return (Fairbairn kick); UCLA – Jordon James 26-yard run (Jerry Neuheisel pass failed)
   	   	   	
4th quarter scoring: NEV – Fajardo 19-yard run (Zuzo kick); UCLA – Paul Perkins 3-yard run (Fairbairn kick); UCLA – Malcolm Jones 25-yard pass from Hundley (Fairbairn kick); UCLA – Jones 1-yard run (Fairbairn kick)

Nebraska

This is the 12th meeting between the two teams, with Nebraska leading the series 6–5. UCLA defeated Nebraska last year 36–30 at the Rose Bowl. When both teams were ranked in 1994, Nebraska (No. 2) won 49–21 over the 13th-ranked Bruins. The teams will honor the passing of UCLA player Nick Pasquale by placing his number 36 on their uniforms.

1st quarter scoring: NEB – Quincy Enunwa 11-yard pass from Taylor Martinez (Pat Smith kick); UCLA – Ka'imi Fairbairn 44-yard field goal; NEB – Enunwa 14-yard pass from Martinez (Mauro Bondi kick)

2nd quarter scoring: NEB – Kenny Bell 22-yard pass from Martinez (Smith kick); UCLA – Paul Perkins 10-yard run (Fairbairn kick)

3rd quarter scoring: UCLA – Jordon James 3-yard run (Fairbairn kick); UCLA – Shaquelle Evans 28-yard pass from Hundley (Fairbairn kick); UCLA – Phillip Ruhl 12-yard pass from Hundley (Fairbairn kick); UCLA – Nate Iese 3-yard pass from Hundley (Fairbairn kick)

4th quarter scoring: UCLA – Fairbairn 24-yard field goal

New Mexico State

First meeting between the two schools. New Mexico State head coach Doug Martin replaced DeWayne Walker, who was a former UCLA defensive coordinator. Nick Pasquale was remembered during the game.

1st quarter scoring: UCLA – Jordon James 4-yard run (Kaim Fairbairn kick)

2nd quarter scoring: UCLA – Steven Manfro 20-yard pass from Brett Hundley (Fairbairn kick); UCLA – Manfro 12-yard run (Fairbairn kick); UCLA – Fairbairn 38-yard field goal; UCLA – Devin Fuller 21-yard pass from Hundley (Fairbairn kick)

3rd quarter scoring: UCLA – Shaquell Evans 7-yard pass from Hundley (Fairbairn kick); UCLA – James 19-yard run (Fairbairn kick)

4th quarter scoring: NMSU – Adam Shapiro 33-yard pass from A. McDonald (Mitch Johnson kick); UCLA – Malcolm Jones 3-yard run (Fairbairn kick); NMSU – B. Betancourt 4-yard run (Johnson kick failed); UCLA – Jones 3-yard run (Fairbairn kick)

Utah

In this series, UCLA has a 9–2 overall record and 3–2 in Salt Lake City. Utah has won two of the last three games with UCLA (2007 and 2011, under Kyle Whittingham). UCLA won last year 21–14.

1st quarter scoring: UCLA – Jordon James 1-yard run (Ka'imi Fairbairn kick); Utah – Dres Anderson 54-yard pass from Travis Wilson (Andy Phillips kick); Utah – Sean Fitzgerald 6-yard pass from Wilson (Phillips kick)

2nd quarter scoring: UCLA – Hundley 7-yard pass from Devin Fuller (Fairbairn kick); UCLA – Jordan Payton 17-yard pass from Hundley (Fairbairn kick); Utah – Phillips 44-yard field goal

3rd quarter scoring: UCLA – Fairbairn 33-yard field goal

4th quarter scoring: Utah – Keith McGill 19-yard interception of Hundley pass (Phillips); UCLA – Fairbairn 47-yard field goal; UCLA – Hundley 36-yard run (Fairbairn kick); UCLA – Hundley 36-yard run (Fairbairn kick); Utah – Phillips 44-yard field goal

California

California is 32–50–1 against UCLA since the series began in 1933. This is Sonny Dykes first year taking on the Bruins as California's head coach, whose team implements an air raid offense that will challenge UCLA's young but talented secondary.  Hoping to avenge last year's 43–17 loss, the Bruins are favored to win at home.

1st quarter scoring: UCLA	– Ka'imi Fairbairn 24-yard field goal; UCLA – Devin Fuller 18-yard pass from Brett Hundley (Fairbairn kick)

2nd quarter scoring: UCLA	– Paul Perkins 1-yard run (Fairbairn kick); CAL	– Vincenzo D'Amato 51-yard field goal; 	
CAL – Daniel Lasco 6-yard run (D'Amato Kick); UCLA – Thomas Duarte 27-yard pass from Hundley (Fairbairn kick)

3rd quarter scoring:  UCLA – Fairbairn 22-yard field goal; UCLA – Fairbairn 27-yard field goal

4th quarter scoring: UCLA	– Shaquelle Evans 22-yard pass from Hundley (Fairbairn kick)

Stanford

1st quarter scoring: STAN – Conrad Ukropina 31-yard field goal

2nd quarter scoring: No scoring

3rd quarter scoring: UCLA – Ka'imi Fairbairn 38-yard field goal; STAN – Kodi Whitfield 30-yard pass from Kevin Hogan (Ukropina kick); STAN – Tyler Gaffney 1-yard run (Ukropina kick)

4th quarter scoring: UCLA – Shaquelle Evans 3-yard pass from Brett Hundley (Fairbairn kick); STAN – Gaffney 4-yard run (Ukropina kick)

Oregon

1st quarter scoring: UCLA – Brett Hundley 4-yard run (Ka'imi Fairbairn kick); ORE – De'Anthony Thomas 1-yard run (Alejandro Maldonado kick)

2nd quarter scoring: ORE – Byron Marshall 40-yard run (Matt Wogan kick); UCLA – Thomas Duarte 11-yard pass from Brett Hundley (Fairbairn kick)

3rd quarter scoring: ORE – Marshall 11-yard run (Maldonado kick)

4th quarter scoring: ORE – Bralon Addison 8-yard pass from Marcus Mariota (Maldonado kick); ORE – Marshall 3-yard run (Maldonado kick); ORE – Thomas Tyner 2-yard run (Wogan kick)

Colorado

1st quarter scoring: COLO – Will Oliver 23-yard field goal; UCLA – Devin Fuller 76-yard pass from Brett Hundley (Ka'Imi Fairbairn kick)

2nd quarter scoring: COLO – Paul Richardson 7-yard pass from Sefo Liufau (Will Oliver kick); UCLA – Hundley 11-yard run (Fairbairn kick); UCLA – Devin Fuller 6-yard pass from Hundley (Fairbairn kick); COLO – Oliver 47-yard field goal

3rd quarter scoring: UCLA – Hundley 1-yard run (Fairbairn kick); UCLA – Damien Thigpen 5-yard run (Fairbairn kick)

4th quarter scoring: COLO – Tony Jones 2-yard run (Oliver kick); UCLA – Fairbairn 45-yard field goal; COLO – Oliver 37-yard field goal; UCLA – Fuller 8-yard run (Fairbairn kick)

Arizona

UCLA leads the series at 20–15–2 and Arizona has won five of last six games between the two teams. Jack Folliard is the referee.

1st quarter scoring: ARIZ – Jake Smith 44-yard field goal; UCLA – Shaquell Evans 66-yard pass from Brett Hundley (Kaim Fairbairn kick); UCLA – Hundley 15-yard run (Fairbairn kick)

2nd quarter scoring: ARIZ – Ka'Deem Carey 4-yard run (Smith kick); UCLA – Evans 4-yard pass from Hundley (Fairbairn kick)

3rd quarter scoring: UCLA – Fairbairn 34-yard field goal; ARIZ – Smith 27-yard field goal

4th quarter scoring: ARIZ – N. Phillips 15-yard pass from B. Denker (2-point conversion failed); UCLA – Myles Jack 66-yard run (Fairbairn kick); ARIZ – Phillips 14-yard pass from Denker (Smith kick)

Washington

The Bruins lead the series, 38–30–2. Last time the teams met, during the 2010 season, Washington won 24–7 in Seattle. UCLA was the winner in the Rose Bowl, a 24–23 decision in 2009. The Bruins have won the last seven straight games played in the Rose Bowl against the Huskies.

1st quarter scoring: UCLA – Myles Jack 8-yard run (Ka'imi Fairbairn kick); UCLA – Cassius Marsh 2-yard pass from Brett Hundley (Fairbairn kick); WASH – Bishop Sankey 2-yard run (Travis Coons kick); UCLA – Jack 1-yard run (failed kick)

2nd quarter scoring: UCLA – Jack 1-yard run (Fairbairn kick); WASH – Jaydon Mickens 2-yard pass from Keith Price (Coons kick); WASH – Coons 34-yard field goal

3rd quarter scoring: WASH – Austin Seferian-Jenkins 1-yard pass from Cyler Miles (Coons kick); UCLA – Jack 2-yard run (Fairbairn kick)

4th quarter scoring: UCLA – Devin Lucien 40-yard pass from Hundley (Fairbairn kick); WASH – Damore'ea Stringfellow 14-yard pass from Miles (Coons kick)

Arizona State

1st quarter scoring: ASU – Taylor Kelly 3-yard run (Zane Gonzalez kick); UCLA – Devin Lucien 42-yard pass from
Brett Hundley (Kaim Fairbairn kick); UCLA – Fairbairn 48-yard field goal; ASU – D. J. Foster 3-yard run (Gonzalez kick)

2nd quarter scoring: ASU – Carl Bradford 18-yard interception return (Gonzalez kick); ASU – Michael Eubank, 1-yard run
(Gonzalez kick); UCLA – Fairbairn 23-yard field goal; ASU – Jaelen Strong 19-yard pass from Kelly (Gonzalez kick)

3rd quarter scoring: UCLA – Myles Jack 3-yard run (Fairbairn kick); UCLA – Paul Perkins 1-yard run (Fairbairn kick); ASU – Gonzalez 28-yard field goal

4th quarter scoring: UCLA – Shaquell Evans 27-yard pass from Hundley (Hundley pass intercepted

USC

Last season, the Bruins defeated the Trojans 38–28 in the Rose Bowl.

1st quarter scoring: UCLA – Myles Jack 3-yard run (Ka'imi Fairbairn kick)

2nd quarter scoring: UCLA – Eddie Vanderdoes 1-yard run (Fairbairn kick); USC – Javorius Allen 11-yard run (Andre Heidari kick)

3rd quarter scoring: UCLA – Brett Hundley 12-yard run (Fairbairn kick); USC – Xavier Grimble 22-yard pass from Cody Kessler (Heidari kick); UCLA – Hundley 5-yard run (Fairbairn kick)

4th quarter scoring: UCLA – Paul Perkins 8-yard run (Fairbairn kick)

Virginia Tech (Sun Bowl)

1st quarter scoring: UCLA – Brett Hundley 7-yard run (Ka'imi Fairbairn kick); VT – J.C. Coleman 1-yard run ( Michael Branthover (kick)

2nd quarter scoring: UCLA – Hundley 86-yard run (Fairbairn kick)

3rd quarter scoring: VT – Branthover 22-yard field goal

4th quarter scoring: UCLA – Paul Perkins 5-yard run (Fairbairn kick); UCLA – Myles Jack intercepted pass from Mark Leal 24-yards return (Fairbairn kick); VT – Sean Covington 3-yard loss for safety; UCLA – Thomas Duarte 8-yard pass from Hundley  (Fairbairn kick); UCLA – Shaquelle Evans 59-yard pass from Hundley (Fairbairn kick)

Coaches

 Jim L. Mora, Head coach
 Noel Mazzone, Offensive coordinator/Quarterbacks
 Adrian Klemm, Offensive line
 Lou Spanos, Defensive coordinator
 Steve Broussard, Running backs
 Jeff Ulbrich, Special teams, Linebackers
 Demetrice Martin, Secondary
 Eric Yarber, Wide receivers
 Angus McClure, Defensive line/Recruiting coordinator
 Taylor Mazzone, Quarterbacks coach

Rankings

Awards and honors
 Anthony barr – Lott IMPACT Trophy
 Xavier Su'a-Filo – Pac-12 Morris Trophy (top lineman)

Eight Bruins were selected to the 2013 Pac-12 Conference Football All-Academic team:

Notes
 September 8, 2013 – Freshman walk-on receiver Nick Pasquale was hit by a car and killed while walking in San Clemente. He was 20.
 September 14, 2013 – A record crowd of 91,471 attended the game at Nebraska
 September 16, 2013 – Anthony Barr, LB, was named Pac-12 defensive player of the week and the Walter Camp Football Foundation player of the week on defense
 September 21, 2013 – UCLA set new school records with 692 yards of total offense and 39 first downs in a game
 November 4, 2013 – No. 19 Jayon Brown was named Pac-12 special teams player of the week
 November 11, 2013 – Myles Jack, LB/RB, is Pac-12 Conference offensive player of the week following the Arizona game
 November 15, 2013 – Linebacker/running back Myles Jack became the first freshman to score four rushing touchdowns in a game for the UCLA
 November 25, 2013 – Defensive back Ishmael Adams was named Pac-12 special teams player of the week
 November 30, 2014 – Second consecutive win over the Trojans (35-14); Largest margin of victory (21-point) at the Coliseum in more than four decades (1970).

References

External links

UCLA
UCLA Bruins football seasons
Sun Bowl champion seasons
UCLA Bruins football